Radasłaŭ Kazimiravič Astroŭski (Radoslav Kazimirovich Ostrovskiy; 25 October 1887 – 17 October 1976) was a Byelorussian collaborator with Nazi Germany who served as president of the Belarusian Central Rada, a puppet Belarusian administration under German hegemony from 1943–1944, and in exile from 1948-1976.

Early years

Radasłaŭ Astroŭski was born on 25 October 1887 in the town of Zapolle, Slutsk Uyezd, Minsk Governorate. He studied at the Slutsk gymnasium, but was expelled for participating in the Russian Revolution of 1905–1907. In 1908 he was accepted to the mathematical faculty of Saint Petersburg University. In 1911, he was arrested for taking part in revolutionary riots and was imprisoned at Saint Petersburg and Pskov. After his release in 1912, he re-entered the university and later transferred to the University of Tartu, from where he graduated with a degree in physics and mathematics.

After University, Astroŭski worked as a teacher in Częstochowa, Poland and in Minsk. From 1915 to 1917 he taught at the Minsk Teaching Institute. After the February Revolution of 1917 he became the commissar of the Provisional Government in Slutsk paviet. In September of the same year he founded the Slutsk Belarusian Gymnasium and became its principal.

Astroŭski opposed the October Revolution of 1917. He was a delegate to the December 1917 First All-Belarusian Congress and published articles where he supported the idea of Belarusian independence. In 1918 Astroŭski was Education Minister in the government of the Belarusian Democratic Republic under Prime Minister Raman Skirmunt. He also took part in the 1920 Slutsk defence action against the Red Army.

Political activity in West Belarus

In 1921, he moved into West Belarus in the Second Polish Republic. He served as principal of the Belarusian Gymnasium of Vilnia from 1924 to 1936. In the second half of the 1920s, he radically changed his political views. In 1924 he initiated the creation of a Polish-Belarusian Society that supported the Polish government. After the breakdown of the Society, Astroŭski cooperated with the Belarusian Communist Party (of Bolsheviks) and with the Communist Party of West Belarus, and managed the illegal komsomol cell in his gymnasium.

In 1925 and 1926 he was the vice-chairman of the Belarusian Peasants' and Workers' Union, the chairman of the Belarusian School Society, and the principal of the Belarusian Cooperation Bank in Wilno, used to transfer finances to the BPWU. In 1926, Astroŭski joined the Communist Party of West Belarus and was arrested by the Polish police. However, during the trial against the Hramada he was found not guilty.

From 1928, he once again changed his political orientation and started to call for cooperation with Polish officials. For that he was condemned by many leaders of the Western Belarusian national movement. In the mid-1930s he published various works in Belarusian calendar books and in the "Rodny Kraj" newspaper, under the pseudonym "Era". In 1936 he had to leave Wilno and moved to Łódź.

Nazi collaborator

During the German occupation of Belarus, Astroŭski actively cooperated with Nazi officials. In 1941 he moved to Minsk and worked in civil administration. He also created Belarusian administrations in Bryansk, Smolensk and Mahilyow and spent certain time as a Bürgermeister in all of those cities.

In 1943, Radasłaŭ Astroŭski became the president of Belarusian Central Rada, a very limited national government, which the Nazis (who had begun to lose on the Eastern front) allowed to be created in order to gain some sympathy from the Belarusian population and therefore to be able to use them against the Soviet army. Although the Rada did not have much real power, it was allowed to manage certain civil issues.

Astroŭski was one of the main organisers of the Second All-Belarusian Congress in 1944.

Astroŭski and his cohorts supported the annihilation of Jews, but had relatively minimal involvement in carrying out the mass murders.

Emigration

After the war, Astroŭski fled the Soviets and ended up in West Germany and lived in the Volksgartenstraße in Langenfeld, Rhineland. In 1956, he moved to the United States and lived in South River, New Jersey. He actively participated in Belarusian national activism aboard, and was the main ideologist of the BCR as the legitimate Belarusian government in exile, thus not admitting such status for the main Belarusian People's Republic Council. Astroŭski became a member of the central committee of the Anti-Bolshevik Bloc of Nations.

Astroŭski died on 17 October 1976 in Benton Harbor, Michigan. He is buried at the Saint Euphrosynia Belarus Orthodox Church Cemetery in South River, New Jersey.

References

External links

Partisan Resistance in Belarus during World War II
Biography of Radasłaŭ Astroŭski (in Belarusian) 

1887 births
1976 deaths
People from Kletsk District
People from Slutsky Uyezd
Belarusian collaborators with Nazi Germany
Belarusian nationalists
Belarusian Peasants' and Workers' Union politicians
Communist Party of Western Belorussia politicians
Members of the Belarusian Central Council
Polish people of Belarusian descent
American people of Belarusian descent
University of Tartu alumni
People from South River, New Jersey
Soviet emigrants to Germany